Gacko Polje is a polje (karstic field) in the Lika region of Croatia, the third largest in Croatia, covering an area of .

References

Plains of Croatia
Geology of Croatia